The Leeward Islands cricket team is a composite cricket team representing the member associations of the Leeward Islands Cricket Association, which itself is a member association of the larger West Indies Cricket Board. The team incorporates players from several small islands in the Leeward Islands grouping of the Lesser Antilles, an island arc in the Caribbean Sea. These are Anguilla, Antigua and Barbuda, the British Virgin Islands, Montserrat, Nevis, Saint Kitts, Sint Maarten, and the United States Virgin Islands, although the sport is most popular in the islands that previously were part of the British Leeward Islands colony (in existence from 1833 to 1958). Although matches were played in the islands from the late 19th century, a combined team was not formed until the early 1950s, when semi-annual matches against a representative Windward Islands team commenced. The Leewards played its first match at first-class level in July 1958, against Jamaica.

For the inaugural 1965–66 season of the Shell Shield, the Leewards and Windwards associations together entered a "Combined Islands" team, an arrangement which persisted on and off until the 1981–82 season, when the associations began to enter separate teams. However, the Leewards still played regularly at first-class level during this time, against other West Indian domestic teams and touring international teams. Since its re-entry into the main domestic first-class competition, the team has played every season, winning the competition four times (as sole winner during the 1989–90, 1993–94, and 1995–96 seasons, and shared with Guyana during the 1997–98 season). In total, the Leewards have played 225 first-class matches, winning 72, drawing 81, losing 72, and having five matches abandoned. Of these, 187 matches were played in the main West Indian domestic competition. A total of 184 players have played at least one first-class match for the team since its debut.


Key

List of players
Statistics only include first-class matches played for the Leeward Islands, and are correct as of 7 June 2013.

List of captains
Twenty-eight players have captained the Leewards in at least one first-class match, with Nevisian Stuart Williams' 38 matches between 1994 and 2004 the most of any one player. Of the team's captains, two were Anguillan, nine Antiguan, one Montserratian, seven Nevisian, eight Kittitian, and one of unknown nationality:

References

Leeward Islands, first-class
First-class